The Hideaway Entertainment is an independent American film and TV production company founded in 2017 by Jonathan Gray and based in Beverly Hills, California. The company's first films produced were Mile 22 (2018), Men in Black: International (2019), Bloodshot (2020), and Cherry (2021).

History 
The Hideaway Entertainment was launched in 2017 by the French American entrepreneur Jonathan Gray who hired Matthew Rhodes (former president of Bold Films) as president. The following year, in 2018, the company produced its first film, the action thriller Mile 22, directed by Peter Berg and featuring Mark Wahlberg, John Malkovich and Iko Uwais.

In 2019, Sony Pictures produced Men in Black: International in association with The Hideaway Entertainment. It opened #1 in every country with a worldwide box office of $260 Million. It starred Chris Hemsworth, Liam Neeson, Tessa Thompson, Kumail Nanjiani, Rebecca Ferguson, and Emma Thompson. In 2020, The Hideaway Entertainment produced the film Bloodshot, a sci-fi action film based on the Valiant Entertainment comic book series of the same name starring Vin Diesel as the lead character.

Since 2020, The Hideaway Entertainment expanded from splashy big-budget movies to more intimate film dramas and TV movies and produced the film Cherry, based on the eponymous book, alongside Anthony and Joe Russo, who also directed the film that was released on Apple TV+ in 2021.

Since then, the company has announced several upcoming productions: Freedom Ride (directed by Deon Taylor), the story of a group of young anti-racist activists during the civil rights era in the United States in the 1960s with a script based on the personal stories of early Freedom Riders such as civil rights icon John Lewis; Combat Control (starring Jake Gyllenhaal and directed by Sam Hargrave), the true story of Combat Controller and Medal of Honor recipient John Chapman; Otherwise Illegal Activity (written by Terence Winter), the true story of a convict recruited by anti-terrorist forces to infiltrate a terrorist organization; Sleep Train (written by Andrew Nunnelly), a parenting comedy; Escape (directed by James Watkins), the true story of the escape convicts Robert Greenhill and Alexander Pearce.

Description 
The Hideaway Entertainment was founded by Jonathan Gray in 2017 and is presided by Matthew Rhodes. Kristy Grisham is the SVP of development & production. The company tags itself as a "story-driven first" production vehicle which aims to support the creative community.

Filmography

References

External links 
 The Hideaway Entertainment at IMDb
 Official website

Video production companies
Entertainment companies established in 2017
2017 establishments in California
American independent film studios
Film production companies of the United States
Entertainment companies based in California
Privately held companies based in California
Companies based in Los Angeles
American film studios